Fernand Hibbert (3 October 1873 - 1928) was a Haitian novelist and is one of the most widely read Haitian authors. He is known for his satiric and humorous novels.

Born in Miragoâne, Hibbert was educated in Paris, France, where he studied law and political science. After returning to Haiti in 1894, he worked as a teacher, politician, and diplomat. Along with his contemporaries Frédéric Marcelin and Justin Lhérisson he worked to establish a uniquely Haitian novel. His 1908 novella Romulus was translated into English in 2013.

Selected works 

 Séna (1905)
 Les Thazar (1907)
 Romulus (1908)
 Masques et Visages (1910)
 Manuscrit de mon Ami (1923)
 Simulacres (1923)
 Romulus. Translated into English. Aylmer, QC: Deux Voiliers, 2013. 
 Pretenders. Les Simulacres translated into English. Aylmer, QC: Deux Voiliers, 2018.

Notes

References

 

1873 births
1928 deaths
Haitian diplomats
Haitian educators
Haitian male novelists
Haitian politicians
People from Miragoâne
20th-century Haitian novelists
20th-century male writers
Haitian expatriates in France